Noonday (spelled Noon Day on 1860s maps) was an unincorporated community located in far north-central Cobb County, Georgia, United States.  It was centered at 34°03'43"N, 84°31'16"W (34.0620437, -84.5213204), along former Georgia highway 5, around the Noonday Baptist Church. This Baptist church is still active today.

The community took its name from nearby Noonday Creek. The community of Blackwells was south of Noonday.

References

Geography of Cobb County, Georgia
Unincorporated communities in Cobb County, Georgia
Unincorporated communities in Georgia (U.S. state)